Alenka Sottler (born 24 October 1958) is a Slovene painter and illustrator. She lives and works in Ljubljana as a freelance illustrator and is a member of New York Society of Illustrators. She has illustrated over 50 books for children and adults, for which she received numerous awards and honours including her second nomination for the Hans Christian Andersen Award in 2014.

Life and career 
Alenka Sottler was born in Ljubljana, the capital city of Slovenia. Her father, Gorazd Sotler, was a sculptor, a pupil of the prominent Croatian sculptor Antun Augustinčič and her mother worked for Slovenia's leading newspaper and printing company, Delo. Alenka received her first informal training in drawing and sculpture in her father's studio. She studied at the Academy of Fine Arts in Ljubljana (1976–1981) and successfully finished her postgraduate study in painting at the Academy of Fine Arts in Ljubljana in 1983. From 1988, she works as freelance painter/ illustrator for the best Slovene and foreign publishers and magazines, including Mladinska knjiga, the largest and leading Slovene publisher. In 2011, she was awarded the title of Assistant Professor of Painting by the University of Ljubljana.

She has illustrated more than 50 books and produced many illustrations for children's magazines. An important part of her output is devoted to fairytales, both modern (Oscar Wilde, Svetlana Makarovič) and classic (Folk Tales from Around the World, Brothers Grimm). Her black-white illustrations for Folk Tales from Around the World signalled her mastery and a number of awards followed. Her work is inventive, visually appealing and drawn with faultless confidence. She is contemporary in style but also well-versed in the history of visual imagery and the imagery of power, meaning and clarity. In recent years she has mainly illustrated poetry and fairytales and made original graphics/engravings for collections of poems by Malcolm de Chazal, and works on paper inspired by literature and poetry.

Today, she lives and works in Ljubljana.

Awards
 2016
 Illustrators 58 Gold Medal, Society of Illustrators, New York, USA
 2014
 Hans Christian Andersen Award nomination, Mexico City, Mexico
 2013
 Prešeren Award (Small), Republic of Slovenia, Ljubljana, Slovenia
 2012
 Merit /3x3 Illustration ProShow No.9 / 3x3 The Magazine of Contemporary Illustration, New York, USA 
 Hans Christian Andersen Award nomination, Denmark
 2011
 "Getting Inside The Outsider", House of Illustration and The Folio Society's Inaugural Book Illustration Competition finalist, London, UK 
 The White Ravens for the book The Emperor and the Rose, Internationale Jugendbibliothek, München, Germany
 2010
 Hinko Smrekar Award at the 9th Slovenian Biennial of Illustration, Ljubljana, Slovenia 
 Merit at the 3x3 Magazine International Professional Show, New York, USA 
 Grand Prix at the 3rd Croatian Biennal of Illustration, Zagreb, Croatia 
 The Astrid Lindgren Memorial Award nomination, Stockholm, Sweden
 2008
 International Board on Books for Young People (IBBY) Honour List, Denmark 
 Italija, Bologna, Award of Excellence, Bologna Book Fair, Italy 
 Hinko Smrekar Award at the 8th Slovenian Biennial of Illustration, Ljubljana, Slovenia
 2007
 Levstik Award for Illustration, Ljubljana, Slovenia 
 Certificate of Merit for being selected for the 49th Annual Exhibition at the SI New York, USA 
 Golden Apple at the Biennial of Illustrations Bratislava 2007, Bratislava, Slovakia
 2006
 Certificate of Merit for being selected for the 48th Annual Exhibition at the SI New York, USA 
 First Prize for illustration at the 6th Slovenian Biennial of Illustration in Slovenia 
 Award for the most beautiful book at the Slovenian Book Fair, Ljubljana, Slovenia
 2005
 Award of Excellence for being selected in the Emperor's New Illustrations, Bologna Book Fair, Italy 
 Certificate of Merit for being selected for the 47th Annual Exhibition at the SI New York, USA
 2002
 First Prize for illustration at the 5th Slovenian Biennial of Illustration in Slovenia
 2001
 Award of Excellence at the BEIJ01 – Biennial of European Illustration in Japan
 1999
 Trojlistok Grand Prix of the Children's Jury at the Biennial of Illustrations Bratislava, Slovakia
 1993
 Hinko Smrekar Award at the 1st Slovenian Biennial of Illustration in Slovenia
 1981
 Prešern Award for students, Ljubljana, Slovenia

Selected Illustrated Works
 Pesem za liro (Poem for Lyra), written by Bina Štampe Žmavc, 2016
 Ljubim tvoj medeni srh (I Love Your Honey Shudder), written by Mateja Blaznik, 2014
 Zašto se baka ljuti? (Why Is Granny Angry?), written by Lela B. Njatin, 2014
 Tujec (L'étranger), written by Albert Camus, 2012
 Prividi (Mirages), written by Niko Grafenauer, 2009
 Cesar in roža (The Emperor and the Rose), written by Bina Štampe Žmavc, 2009
 Svetlanine pravljice (Svetlana's Fairytales), written by Svetlana Makarovič, 2008
 Tri pesnitve (Three Poems), written by Andrej Brvar, 2009
 Pepelka (Cinderella), 2005
 Ko pridejo angelčki (When the Little Angels Come), written by Dim Zupan, 2004
 Svetovne pravljice (Fairy Tales of the World), 2004
 Mehurčki (Bubbles), written by Oton Župančič, 2004
 Anastazija Krupnik (Anastasia Krupnik), written by Lois Lowry, 2002
 Velik sončen dan: izbrane pesmi za otroke in mladino (A Big Sunny Day: selected poems for children and youth), written by Neža Maurer, 2000

References

External links
 Alenka Sottler's official page

Slovenian illustrators
Living people
1958 births
Artists from Ljubljana
Levstik Award laureates
University of Ljubljana alumni
Slovenian women artists
Slovenian women illustrators